Giovanni Serrapica may refer to:

 John Serry, Sr. (Giovanni Serrapica, 1915–2003), concert accordionist, arranger and composer
John Serry Jr. (John Serrapica Jr., born 1954), US musician
 Giovanni Serrapica (footballer) (born 1981), Italian footballer